High Desert State Prison is a state prison in unincorporated Clark County, Nevada, near Indian Springs, northwest of Las Vegas. It is the largest institution of the Nevada Department of Corrections and the newest, having opened on September 1, 2000. It has a capacity of 4,176.

Facilities
It was designed as the most secure prison within the Nevada Department of Corrections system. High Desert State Prison contains 12 housing units designed to house 336 inmates each. Each of units 1–8 are separated into four (4) sections called "pods." Each set of two "pods" shares a common control center and staff office. Each set of two pods also shares a sally port and an activity room. There is also a  infirmary at the institution. All of the facility is located at a  site which is kept secure by a lethal electrified fence and seven armed towers, as well as a roving perimeter patrol officer. Construction completed in 2009 added 1,344 beds to the original 2,671, for a total capacity of 4,176.

The Tonopah Conservation Camp is associated with the prison. The Clark County School District provides the education program on site using 8 classrooms and 2 libraries.

History
The institution opened on 1 September 2000 and became the reception unit for southern Nevada. This facility was designed to be the first of several prisons to be built at this location. The facility presented many design challenges, such as electrical backup and water supply, and there have been difficulties in staff retention due to the remote location. To date, there have been two expansions. The first expansion, completed in 2004, added a  prison industries building and a gymnasium. The second expansion added four more housing units. High Desert is one of the largest prisons in the United States, and is a medium security facility. High Desert is structurally the most secure prison in the Nevada Department of Corrections.

Selected residents
 O. J. Simpson, former Buffalo Bills running back, was briefly held at High Desert State Prison following his conviction in December 2008. He was then transferred to the Lovelock Correctional Center in Pershing County before being released in 2017.
 Musician Ronald Joseph Radke was incarcerated in High Desert State Prison from August 2008 to December 2010 on possession of a dangerous weapon and probation violation charges.
 Chaz Higgs, a former nurse who was convicted of murder in the death of his wife, Nevada State Controller Kathy Augustine, is serving a 20-year to life sentence at High Desert State Prison.
 MMA fighter War Machine is incarcerated here. He was sentenced to 36 years to life for severely beating his ex-girlfriend, Christy Mack.
 Thomas Randolph, a Las Vegas murderer, the subject of a 2021 NBC three-part Dateline documentary, "The Widower", by producer Dan Slepian. Randolph was found guilty in 2017 by a jury, of the 2008 first-degree murders of his 6th wife and his handyman. Randolph's crimes, the murder investigations, and his murder trial, were documented as part of a 13-year investigation by NBC. He received two death sentences in 2017. Those two death sentences were overturned on appeal in December 2020. No new trial date for Randolph has been set as of February 2021.
 Erich Nowsch, convicted of the high-profile 2015 murder of Tammy Meyers in Las Vegas, which was the subject of multiple episodes of ABC’s show 20/20, is currently serving a life sentence in the prison.

See also

References

External links
 High Desert State Prison

2000 establishments in Nevada
Prisons in Nevada
Buildings and structures in Clark County, Nevada
Residential buildings in the Las Vegas metropolitan area